Damian Gjini (born 6 April 1995) is a professional footballer who plays as a midfielder for Greek Super League 2 club Kifisia. Born in Greece, he has represented Albania at youth international level.

Career
On 4 August 2017 Gjini was loaned out again from Panionios to Football League (Greece) club AO Chania Kissamikos.

At the end of December 2019 it was confirmed, that Gjini would join Rodos FC from 2020.

Career statistics

Club

References

External links

1995 births
Living people
Footballers from Athens
Greek footballers
Association football midfielders
Albanian footballers
Albania youth international footballers
Albania under-21 international footballers
Panionios F.C. players
Kallithea F.C. players
AO Chania F.C. players
KF Laçi players
Rodos F.C. players
Super League Greece players
Football League (Greece) players
Greek people of Albanian descent